Blaj (archaically spelled as Blaș; ; ; Transylvanian Saxon: Blußendref) is a city in Alba County, Transylvania, Romania. It has a population of 20,630 inhabitants.

The landmark of the city is the fact that it was the principal religious and cultural center of the Romanian Greek-Catholic Church in Transylvania.

History
Blaj is first mentioned in 1271 as Villa Herbordi, after the deed of a Count Herbod. In 1313, the domain passed to Herbod's son Blasius Cserei and the town was mentioned as Blasii. Started as a hamlet for the twenty families of servants of the noble's court, it was awarded town status on May 19, 1737.

Blaj is the principal religious and cultural center of Greek Catholics in Transylvania. At 27 October 1687 begins the history of the Romanian Church United with Rome, Greek-Catholic, history directly connected to the history of the town Blaj. It all started at the end of the treaty through which Transylvania was entering under the protection of Austria, renouncing the protection of the Turkish Empire.

The first public school in Romanian was established in Blaj in 1754. Blaj was the first place to have Romanian written with Latin alphabet instead of Cyrillic in which it had traditionally been written. Blaj was also a center for the Romanian Age of Enlightenment, being the founding site of the Transylvanian School that promoted the Roman cultural heritage of the Romanians. Thus Blaj gained the nickname "The Little Rome", as Romania's national poet Mihai Eminescu called it.

In 1848, Câmpia Libertății in Blaj was where over 40,000 Romanians met to protest Transylvania becoming a part of Hungary, holding that the lands would be stolen from them.

Geography
Blaj lies at the confluence of the Târnava Mare and Târnava Mică rivers, 
where they form the Târnava River.

Climate
Blaj has a humid continental climate (Cfb in the Köppen climate classification). The city has a continental temperate climate, characteristic for the Transylvanian Plateau, with moderate precipitations of around 550 mm/m2.

<div style="width:70%;">

Demographics

Ethnicity
Romanians - 16,779 (83.78%)
Hungarians - 1,305 (6.51%)
Romani - 1,850 (9.23%)
Germans - 45 (0.22%)

By Religion
Romanian Orthodox - 14,784 (71.19%)
Greek-Catholic - 2,732 (13.24%)
Roman Catholic - 744 (3.58%)
Reformed Church - 985
Baptist - 408
Pentecostal - 220

Government
The city administers eight villages: Deleni-Obârșie (Obursatanya), Flitești, Izvoarele (until 1960 Ciufud; Csufud), Mănărade (Monora), Petrisat (Magyarpéterfalva), Spătac (Szászpatak), Tiur (Tűr) and Veza (Véza).

Education

Attractions
The castle of the Bethlen dynasty is a popular tourist site near Blaj. Other sights worth visiting include the Metropolitan Palace, the Holy Trinity Cathedral, the "Buna Vestire" Monastery, the Greeks' Church, the "Liberty Field",  and Avram Iancu's oak.

Twin towns — Sister cities

Blaj is twinned with:
  Allschwil
  Morlanwelz
  Recanati

Natives
 Tiberiu Bărbulețiu (born 1963), politician
 Silviu Bindea (1912–1992), footballer
 Matei Boilă (1926–2015), politician, Greek-Catholic priest
 Bogdan Cistean (born 1986), footballer
 Sonia Colceru (born 1934), volleyball player
 Ferenc Csentery (1937–2014), abstract metal sculptor
 Doina Ivănescu (1935–1996), volleyball player
 Bogdan Jica (born 2000), footballer
 Nicolae Linca (1929–2008), welterweight boxer
 Daniel Lupașcu (born 1981), footballer
 Ioan Simu (1875–1948), Greek-Catholic priest and politician
 Ioan Suciu (1907–1953), bishop of the Greek-Catholic Church
 Daniel Tătar (born 1987), footballer
 Samuil Vulcan (1758–1839), bishop of the Greek-Catholic Church

See also
 Bethlen Castle
 Câmpia Libertății

References

External links

 Blaj - Sunrise of Romanians (A short documentary film about Blaj)

 
Populated places in Alba County
Cities in Romania
Localities in Transylvania
Capitals of former Romanian counties